Chandra Mohan Kumar, MBBS, DARCS, FFARCS, MSc, FRCA, EDRA, FAMS (Born on 24 June 1948) is an  ophthalmic anaesthetist of world repute. In 2010, he was named Britain’s Top Doctor under the anesthesia category by The Times newspaper. He did an extensive work on fasting guidelines, ophthalmic anaesthesia, elderly anaesthesia, local anaesthesia,  endocrine anaesthesia, oral anesthesia, airway management.

In four decades of his career, he has worked in the medical field in various capacities. In the course of his professional career, he published around 200 research papers and 10 books, and some books were translated in other languages.

Life and Education 
He was born on 24 June 1948 in Cheran Village, Bihar, India. Initially, he attended high school in Harnaut, Bihar. Later, he enrolled in Bihar National College, Patna University, in order to complete intermediate studies.

A graduate of Prince of Wales Medical College, Patna, which is now known as Patna Medical College Hospital (PMCH), he received his MBBS degree in 1973. From 1976 to 1979, he worked at the Bihar Military Hospital, Patna as a Civil Assistant Surgeon.

After arrival in England in 1979, he was enrolled in the Faculty of Anesthesia at the Royal College of Surgeons in England, London and received DARCS (Diploma in Anaesthesia). Further, he received higher degrees, FFARCS from the Faculty of Anaesthesia, Royal College of Surgeons in Ireland in 1984, MSc. (Medical Informatics) from the University of Teesside, Middlesbrough, UK in 1997, FRCA (Fellow of the Royal College of Anaesthetists in 2001, London), EDRA (European Diploma in Regional Anaesthesia in 2010 by the European Society of Regional Anaesthesia, Brussels). He was conferred honorary FAMS (Fellow of Academy of Medicine Singapore) in 2022.

Career 
Upon completion of his MBBS, he served as a House Officer and Senior House Officer in various medical sub-specialties at PMCH between 1973 and 1976. In 1976, he worked as a Civil Assistant Surgeon at the Bihar Military Police Hospital in Patna.

Upon moving to the United Kingdom in 1979, he joined the National Health Service (NHS). He worked as position of Registrar in Anaesthesia at District General Hospital, Sunderland and South Cleveland Hospital Middlesbrough between 1982 to 1984, and later held the position of Senior Registrar in Anaesthesia at Northern Region Health Authority, Newcastle from 1984 to 1987. The Royal College of Surgeons in Ireland awarded him the designation of Fellow of the Faculty of Anaesthetists (FFARCS) in 1984.

He later became a Consultant Anaesthetist at James Cook University Hospital, Middlesbrough. In 2001, he received FRCA (Fellow, Royal College of Anaesthetists, London).
Additionally, he was offered Honorary Professor for running MSc in Evidence Based Anaesthesia Practice at School of Health, University of Teesside, Middlesbrough, UK (2004-2014).
He retired from NHS in March 2011 and moved to Singapore and appointed as Senior Consultant Anaesthetist in Khoo Teck Puat Hospital. He is also a Visiting Professor at Newcastle University Medical School in Malaysia.

Awards 
 Top Britain Doctors in the anaesthesia category in 2010. 
 Platinum 2010 Award presented by the Advisory Committee of Clinical Excellence Award, Department of Health to a practicing UK consultant in the National Health Service.  
 Lifetime achievement award by the British Ophthalmic Anaesthesia Society in 2010.

Books & Publications 
Professor Chandra have published more than 200 research papers and edited/authored more than 8 books. He has h-index of 27, I index of 61. His research garnered more than 2520 citations and Research Interest Score of 1061.

Here is list of his published books:

Principles and Practice of Ophthalmic Anaesthesia 
ISBN 9789386261236.
Editor: Jaichandra VV, Kumar Chandra M, Jagadeesh V
Publisher: Jaypee Brothers Medical Publishers (P) Ltd Jaypee
https://www.jaypeedigital.com/book/9789386261236
DOI: 10.5005/jp/books/14237

Oxford Anaesthesia Library Anaesthesia for the Elderly Patient ,
ISBN 9789386261236.
Editor:  Chris Dodds, Chandra Kumar, Frederique Servin
Publisher: Oxford University Press, 2nd Edition
https://doi.org/10.1093/med/9780199234622.002.0004

Oxford Textbook of Anaesthesia for the elderly, 
ISBN 9780199604999.
Editor:  Dodds C, Kumar Chandra M, Veering B.
Publisher: Oxford University Press, 
https://doi.org/10.1093/med/9780199604999.001.0001

Oxford Handbook of Ophthalmic Anaesthesia, 
ISBN 9780199604999.
Editor:  Chandra Kumar, Chris Dodds, Steven Gayer
Publisher: Oxford University Press
https://doi.org/10.1093/med/9780199591398.001.0001

Oxford Textbook in Anaesthesia, Anaesthesia for Maxilofacial Surgery, 
ISBN 9780199564217.
Editor:  Ian Shaw, Chandra Kumar, Chris Dodds
Publisher: Oxford University Press
https://doi.org/10.1093/med/9780199564217.001.0001

Oxford Anaesthesia Library Anaesthesia for the Elderly Patient, 
ISBN 978-0-19-923524-7, 2008
Editor:  Chris Dodds, Chandra Kumar, Frederique Servin
Publisher: Oxford University Press, 1st Edition
https://doi.org/10.1093/med/9780199234622.002.0004

Gastrointestinal and Colorectal Anesthesia, 
ISBN 0-8493-4073-X.
Editor:  C. M. Kumar M. Bellamy
Publisher: Informa Healthcare, New York, USA
https://doi.org/10.1093/bja/aem349

Practical Guide to Clinical Procedures and Common Emergencies, 
ISBN 9026519710, 9789026519710.
Editor: Chandra M Kumar, Chriss Dodds
Publisher: Taylor and Francis
   
Clinical Teaching: A guide to teaching practical Anaesthesia, ISBN
Editor:  David Greaves, Chris Dodds, Chandra M. Kumar, Berend Mets
Publisher: Swets & Zeitlinger, The Netherlands
https://www.routledge.com/Clinical-Teaching-A-Guide-to-Teaching-Practical-Anaesthesia/Dodds-Greaves-Kumar-Mets/p/book/9789026519413

Ophthalmic Anaesthesia, 
ISBN 9789026519413.
Editor:  Kumar Chandra, Dodds Chris, Fanning Gary
Publisher: Swets & Zeitlinger
https://www.researchgate.net/publication/311648814_Ophthalmic_Anaesthesia

References 

1948 births
Living people
British anaesthetists
Medical doctors from Bihar
Scholars from Bihar
Writers from Bihar
Patna University alumni
People from Nalanda district